The Hue College of Foreign Languages is a college established in 2004 in Huế, Vietnam. It is part of Huế University.

See also
 List of universities in Vietnam

References

External links
 

Huế University
Buildings and structures in Huế
Language schools